Ellingstring is a village and civil parish in Wensleydale in North Yorkshire, England, about  south-east of Leyburn, and  north of Masham. It lies within the Harrogate district, but historically was in the wapentake of Hang East. The population of the parish was estimated at 80 in 2012.

The parish now shares a grouped parish council, known as Fearby, Healey and District Parish Council, with Colsterdale, Fearby, Healey and Ilton cum Pott. It falls within the Skipton and Ripon constituency for the UK Parliament. The name of the village was first recorded in 1198 as Elingstrengge, and derives from the Old English Ella and the Old Norse strengr, meaning watercourse.

References

External links

Villages in North Yorkshire
Civil parishes in North Yorkshire
Wensleydale